Ronald George Rolfe (born 10 March 1941) is a former Australian rules footballer who played with South Melbourne in the Victorian Football League (VFL).

Notes

External links 

Ron Rolfe's playing statistics from The VFA Project

Living people
1941 births
Australian rules footballers from Victoria (Australia)
Sydney Swans players
Moorabbin Football Club players
Caulfield Football Club players
Waverley Football Club players